Moro is an unincorporated community and census-designated place (CDP) in Madison County, Illinois, United States. As of the 2020 census it had a population of 387. Moro, like all of Madison County, is part of the Illinois Metro-East region of the Greater St. Louis metropolitan area.

The city of Moro, Oregon, is named for the Illinois community.

Geography
Moro is located in northwestern Madison County and sits at the northeast edge of the urban portion of the Metro-East area. Moro has a post office with ZIP code 62067.

The community drains west to Rocky Branch, a tributary of the East Fork of the Wood River, running to the Mississippi River at East Alton.

References

Census-designated places in Madison County, Illinois
Census-designated places in Illinois
Unincorporated communities in Madison County, Illinois
Unincorporated communities in Illinois